Jack Caffery may refer to:

Jack Caffery (track and field athlete)
Jack Caffery (ice hockey)

Fiction
DI Jack Caffery